The First Dynasty of Ur was a 26th-25th century BCE dynasty of rulers of the city of Ur in ancient Sumer. It is part of the Early Dynastic period III of the history of Mesopotamia. It was preceded by the earlier First Dynasty of Kish and the First Dynasty of Uruk.

Rule
According to the Sumerian King List, the final ruler of the First Dynasty of Uruk Lugal-kitun was overthrown by Mesannepada of Ur. There were then four kings in the First Dynasty of Ur: Mesannepada, Mes-kiagnuna, Elulu, and Balulu. Two other kings earlier than Mes-Anepada are known from other sources, namely Mes-kalam-du and A-Kalam-du. It would seem that Mes-Anepada was the son of Mes-kalam-du, according to the inscription found on a bead in Mari, and Mes-kalam-du was the founder of the dynasty. A probable Queen Puabi is also known from her lavish tomb at the Royal Cemetery at Ur. The First Dynasty of Ur had extensive influence over the area of Sumer, and apparently led a union of south Mesopotamian polities.

Ethnicity and language
Like other Sumerians, the people of Ur were a non-Semitic people who may have come from the east circa 3300 BCE, and spoke a language isolate. Sumer was conquered by the Semitic-speaking kings of the Akkadian Empire around 2270 BC (short chronology), but Sumerian continued as a sacred language. Native Sumerian rule re-emerged for about a century in the Third Dynasty of Ur at approximately 2100–2000 BC, but the Akkadian language also remained in use.

International trade

The artifacts found in the royal tombs of the dynasty show that foreign trade was particularly active during this period, with many materials coming from foreign lands, such as Carnelian likely coming from the Indus or Iran, Lapis Lazuli from the Badakhshan area of Afghanistan, silver from Turkey, copper from Oman, and gold from several locations such as Egypt, Nubia, Turkey or Iran. Carnelian beads from the Indus were found in Ur tombs dating to 2600-2450, in an example of Indus-Mesopotamia relations. In particular, carnelian beads with an etched design in white were probably imported from the Indus Valley, and made according to a technique developed by the Harappans. These materials were used into the manufacture of beautiful objects in the workshops of Ur.

The Ur I dynasty had enormous wealth as shown by the lavishness of its tombs. This was probably due to the fact that Ur acted as the main harbour for trade with India, which put her in a strategic position to import and trade vast quantities of gold, carnelian or lapis lazuli. In comparison, the burials of the kings of Kish were much less lavish. High-prowed Sumerian ships may have traveled as far as Meluhha, thought to be the Indus region, for trade.

Demise

According to the Sumerian King List, the First Dynasty of Ur was finally defeated, and power went to the Elamite Awan dynasty. The Sumerian king Eannatum (c.2500–2400 BCE) of Lagash, then came to dominate the whole region, and established one of the first verifiable empires in history.

The power of Ur would only revive a few centuries later with the Third Dynasty of Ur.

List of rulers

Sumerian King List
Only the final kings of the First Dynasty of Ur, from Mesannepada to Balulu and possibly 4 unnamed kings, are mentioned in the Sumerian King List:

Artifacts

The Royal Cemetery of Ur held the tombs of several rulers of the First Dynasty of Ur. The tombs are particularly lavish, and testify to the wealth of the First Dynasty of Ur. One of the most famous tombs is that of Queen Puabi.

See also

Sumerian King List
History of Sumer
Third Dynasty of Ur

References

 
Former kingdoms